Respect Me is the second independent album, and fifth overall, by rapper Lil' Flip. This album is described by Lil' Flip as "the album before the album." Guest appearances for the album include Eden, Kokane, Jay Townsend, Ceven & Bobby Moon. A video for "Da #1 Fly Boy" was released on October 30, 2009.

Track listing

References

2009 albums
Lil' Flip albums